Preslar is a surname. Notable people with the surname include:

Casey Preslar (born 1980), American beauty pageant contestant
Len Preslar (born 1947), American economist
Lyle Preslar, American musician